Zaboo or Zabu may refer to:

 Zaboo, a character in The Guild (web series)
 Zaboo, a character in the video game Lunacy (video game)
 Zabu, a fictional saber-toothed tiger in Marvel Comics